Tristan Marshall (born December 19, 2003) is a footballer who plays for North Toronto Nitros in League1  Ontario. Born in Canada, he represents the Saint Vincent and the Grenadines national team.

University career
In 2021, he began playing for the Toronto Metropolitan University (previously Ryerson University) men's soccer team, making one appearance in his first season. On October 2, 2022, he scored twice in a match against the Queen's Gaels for his first university goals.

Club career
Marshall played in the Toronto Skillz FC youth academy, making his debut for the first team in League1 Ontario on July 28, 2019 against Oakville Blue Devils FC.

In 2022, he played for North Toronto Nitros in League 1 Ontario.

International career
Born in Canada, Marshall represents the Saint Vincent and the Grenadines national team. In 2019, he played for the U17 team at the 2019 CONCACAF U-17 Championship qualifying tournament. He captained the U20 team at the 2020 CONCACAF U-20 Championship qualifying tournament. At age 15, he made his debut for the senior team, at the 2019 Windward Islands Tournament, playing 90 minutes in their final match of the tournament, helping the team win the tournament.

Career statistics

Club

International

References

Notes

External links
 

2003 births
Living people
Soccer players from Toronto
Association football defenders
People with acquired Saint Vincent and the Grenadines citizenship
Saint Vincent and the Grenadines footballers
Saint Vincent and the Grenadines international footballers
Saint Vincent and the Grenadines under-20 international footballers
Saint Vincent and the Grenadines youth international footballers
Canadian soccer players
Canadian people of Saint Vincent and the Grenadines descent
League1 Ontario players
Toronto Skillz FC players
North Toronto Nitros players